Häxan is a soundtrack to the 1922 Swedish/Danish silent horror film of the same name composed by Barði Jóhannsson.

It also is the first album he released under his own name (he had before released 3 studio albums and a few singles with his bands Bang Gang and Lady and Bird). It was performed by the Bulgarian Symphony Orchestra, produced by Barði Jóhannson and Thorir Baldursson,  and released in 2006.

Track listing

Musicians
 Barði Jóhannsson - written and produced.
 Bulgarian Symphony Orchestra

2006 albums